Me and the Forty Year Old Man is a 1965 French film directed by Jacques Pinoteau.

Cast
Dany Saval	as Caroline
Paul Meurisse as Alexandre Dumourier
Michel Serrault as Bénéchol
Paul Hubschmid as Jean-Marc Oesterlin
Paolo Ferrari as Casserti
Michel Galabru as Bricaud
Angelo Bardi as Le chauffeur de Dumourier
Michèle Bardollet as Ginette
Maurice Bourbon as Le réceptionniste
Maurice Coussonneau as Coussonneau
Jacques David as Le sergent
Alice Field as Mme de Trévise
Henri Garcin as Le voisin de Bénéchol
Guy Jacquet
Jean-Pierre Moutier as Maxime, le fiancé de Caroline (as J.P. Moutier)

External links
 

1965 films
Italian comedy films
West German films
French comedy films
1960s French-language films
Films scored by Claude Bolling
German comedy films
1960s French films
1960s Italian films
1960s German films